Pine City is a former mining settlement in Mono County, California in the late 1870s and early 1880s. It was located southwest of Old Mammoth, on the shore of Lake Mary, at an elevation of 8986 feet (2739 m).

Fictional References
In the television show Bonanza, Season 5, Episode 25, called "Return to Honor", Ben gets word that his nephew, Will, has been murdered in Pine City.

References

Former settlements in Mono County, California
Former populated places in California